Migrant Mother is a photograph taken in 1936 in Nipomo, California by American photographer Dorothea Lange during her spell at the Resettlement Administration (later the Farm Security Administration). Since then, the photograph has become an icon of the Great Depression and because it is in the public domain, it has been reproduced to serve as advertisements and much more. Today, Lange's work is considered to be a part of the classic canon of American art and international photography. The 28.3 by 21.8 cm (11 1/8 by 8 9/16 in) gelatin silver print photograph depicts two children burying their faces in their mother who anxiously gazes off into the distance. A print is housed at the Museum of Modern Art in New York City.

Description
Migrant Mother depicts a mother looking off into the distance with two of her children at her sides and an infant in her lap. Her children's faces are not shown as the children both bury their faces in their mother's shoulders. The black and white photograph print held in the Museum of Modern Art is approximately the same size as a sheet of North American printer paper (11 1/8 by 8 9/16 in) so the woman and her children are smaller than life-sized figures. 

The mother is the focal point of this photograph as she is the only person in the photograph without an obscured face. This was intentional as Lange instructed the two children to turn their backs to the camera and rest their hands on their mother's shoulders. By doing so, Lange was able to eliminate any possibility of unwanted effects from exchanges and competing countenances. Thus, the viewer's attention is immediately drawn towards the mother's anxious face rather than her children. Unlike the five other photographs Lange took that day, Migrant Mother's frame is much more focused on the mother and children as the frame does not allow any room for the background to be shown. In fact, the only parts of the photograph that are shown are above the mother's and children's head.

Execution
Migrant Mother was achieved through a process of deliberate and careful intervention by Lange. Although she considered herself a documentary photographer and stuck to the belief that she should not intervene in the subject of her photography, Lange manipulated the framing and the subjects to finally arrive to her final shot.

Lange found the mother and her children somewhat by accident. She was driving home in March 1936 on a cold, rainy afternoon in Nipomo, California when she passed a sign that said “Pea-Pickers Camp”. She continued to drive but could not shake the image of the sign from her memory and turned around heading for the camp. In a memoir written by Lange about the photoshoot, she writes, “I was on my way and barely saw a crude sign with pointing arrow which flashed by me at the side of the road saying Pea-Pickers Camp. But out of the corner of my eye I did see it… Having well convinced myself for twenty miles that I could continue on, I did the opposite. Almost without realizing what I was doing, I made a U-turn on the empty highway”. When Lange first arrived to the camp of migrant pea pickers, she took two snapshots of the mother's tent and her children. In the tent was the mother, her teenage daughter, and three young children. Realizing that these photographs lacked a central focus, Lange honed in on the mother and her children.

Lange moved closer to the tent and took a third snapshot of just the mother and her baby asking the two young children at her side to move out of the frame. In this photograph the mother is breastfeeding her baby as she looks down. The mother looks tired and worn in her makeshift tent home. Despite capturing an intimate moment where a mother is nursing her child, Lange sensed a flaw in the photograph – the mother's gaze. The mother was looking downward, “... as if wishing to shield herself from the scrutiny of the camera”. For Lange, this expression spoiled the image. She and her colleagues tried as best they could to present their subjects as dignified human beings in order to elicit sympathy rather than ridicule. Lange sensed that she was invading her subject's privacy and was causing discomfort so she moved on to her fourth shot to regain composure.

In Lange's fourth photograph, she asks one of the children to enter the frame and to stand with her chin resting on her mother's shoulder. In this photograph, the mother is looking up into the distance with her daughter's head resting on her shoulder and her baby on her lap. The mother's expression in this photograph was now acceptable for Lange. She decided to take another but made some critical changes looking at what was captured in the background of the photograph.

Lange moved herself to the left and switched from her previously horizontal orientation to a vertical orientation of the frame. This allowed her to center the mother, the child, and the baby and left ample headroom for them. Additionally, moving left cut out the details in the background which she preferred not to show because of the possible implications that might sour viewers’ image of her subjects. Lange took one last picture of the mother and her children, but this time she asked a second child to step in the frame. There were now a total of three children in the frame. The mother held her baby in her lap and her two children stood at her sides. In order to remove any possibility of competing gazes and any exchanges that might create unwanted effects, Lange asked both children to turn their backs towards the camera and place their hands on their mother's shoulders. Lange then moved closer to the mother, focusing her at the center of the frame and excluding any other background such that the mother and her children were the only objects in the frame. This last photograph is now known as Migrant Mother. According to Lange, she was only at the camp for ten minutes. After her last shot she finally closed her camera and went home.

Identity of family 
The subjects of Lange's photography were always nameless. Roy Stryker, a manager of the FSA's photographic project, had his photographers practice contemporary social science techniques in captioning their images. This allowed the subjects to be viewed as common men and women under unfortunate circumstances that the Roosevelt administration was trying to improve. Several decades after the photograph's publication, a journalist found the identity of the iconic photograph's mother – Florence Thompson – discovering that she was born in 1903 in a Cherokee reservation in Oklahoma. She married at the age of seventeen and had six children until her husband died in 1931. In 1933, she became pregnant again. Fearing that welfare authorities would take her child away, she moved back to Oklahoma. In 1934, her whole family moved out to Shafter, California where she worked in fields and began a relationship with James Hill. She had four more children with him. When Lange met Thompson, Hill and Thompson's sons were out looking to get their car fixed. In 1958, 22 years after the photograph had been published, Thompson saw Migrant Mother in a magazine and wrote to the magazine asking them to recall all unsold magazines to protect her and her family's rights. At that point the photograph had become public property and its publication was far beyond the reach of Lange's control. Once Thompson and her family came to know this, they withdrew their complaint and now speak positively about Lange.

Interpretation and legacy
Migrant Mother's furrowed brow and hand placement suggests anxiety and worry about her duties as a mother to nurture and protect her children. Her expression and juxtaposition with her children and clothing indicates that the family is overcome by circumstances they cannot control, thus removing any blame from the mother. The children leaning on their mother depicts the mother as the children's pillar of strength. The absence of any space between the mother and children implies that the family have become one flesh in their suffering. In fact, photography scholar Sally Stein writes that if the photograph depicted the mother without her children, the photograph would have much less power. She argues that because the children are so close to their mother that through this visual compression, the merged mother with her children represents a sort of bondage. As a mother herself and a photographer of the working-class people, Lange was aware of this imprisonment and shared the complex anxiety felt by the mother. In addition to the presence of children, Stein argued that due to these implications and lack of resolution, Migrant Mother held a sort of inner tension that added to its power.

The process in which Lange obtained Migrant Mother revealed key insights into the prevailing social norms at the time and reflects key aspects in Lange's life. By 1936, Lange was married to a new man and was much happier in this marriage than her previous one. She felt like she was starting a new chapter in her life and felt more in control. Lange's process reflects this new chapter in her life. James Curtis, a scholar of FSA photography, writes, “The Migrant Mother series reflects Lange’s new mood… Lange moved confidently in arranging her compositions. She knew the image she wanted, knew what to feature and what to leave out”. Lange and her colleagues worked very hard to convey their subjects with dignity such that their plight would receive sympathy rather than ridicule. Her transition from photograph to photograph in the Migrant Mother series reveals this as she chooses to remove and alter key aspects of the frame in order to achieve a certain aesthetic. For example, she chooses to remove the teenager altogether from the final photographs to remove the questions such as, “Was she [the mother] a teenager herself when she gave birth to her first child?”. Curtis writes, “While middle-class viewers were sympathetically disposed to the needs of impoverished children, teenagers posed thorny questions of personal responsibility”.

Since its publication, Migrant Mother has become an icon of the Great Depression. The photograph has been in the public domain and since then it has been reproduced many times including as postage stamps, as advertisements, for charity fundraising, and as magazine covers. The Black Panthers even put an afro on the mother. However, the legacy of Migrant Mother extended further than just to media. In the summer of 1983, the photograph was published in the national press. Florence Thompson was ill with cancer, but had no insurance to help pay the costs. Her children pleaded for money to help with the costs and within weeks, they were able to raise $30,000 for their dying mother. Thompson eventually succumbed to her ails and passed in mid-September. Although most people will likely not know who Dorothea Lange is nor will they know the identity of the Migrant Mother, many recognize the mother's face as an emblem of the Great Depression.

See also
 List of photographs considered the most important

References

1936 works
1936 in art
Black-and-white photographs
Photographs of the United States
1930s photographs
Great Depression in the United States